Cowan is a census-designated place (CDP) in Stanislaus County, California. The 2010 United States census reported Cowan's population was 318.

Geography
According to the United States Census Bureau, the CDP covers an area of 0.2 square miles (0.4 km2), all of it land.

Demographics

The 2010 United States Census reported that Cowan had a population of 318. The racial makeup of Cowan was 274 (86.2%) White, 0 (0.0%) African American, 2 (0.6%) Native American, 0 (0.0%) Asian, 0 (0.0%) Pacific Islander, 32 (10.1%) from other races, and 10 (3.1%) from two or more races. Hispanic or Latino of any race were 161 persons (50.6%).

The Census reported that 318 people (100% of the population) lived in households, 0 (0%) lived in non-institutionalized group quarters, and 0 (0%) were institutionalized.

There were 94 households, out of which 39 (41.5%) had children under the age of 18 living in them, 50 (53.2%) were opposite-sex married couples living together, 11 (11.7%) had a female householder with no husband present, 10 (10.6%) had a male householder with no wife present.  There were 9 (9.6%) unmarried opposite-sex partnerships, and 2 (2.1%) same-sex married couples or partnerships. 13 households (13.8%) were made up of individuals, and 8 (8.5%) had someone living alone who was 65 years of age or older. The average household size was 3.38.  There were 71 families (75.5% of all households); the average family size was 3.76.

The population was spread out, with 86 people (27.0%) under the age of 18, 43 people (13.5%) aged 18 to 24, 74 people (23.3%) aged 25 to 44, 78 people (24.5%) aged 45 to 64, and 37 people (11.6%) who were 65 years of age or older.  The median age was 37.0 years. For every 100 females, there were 105.2 males.  For every 100 females age 18 and over, there were 112.8 males.

The homeowner vacancy rate was 1.3%; the rental vacancy rate was 16.7%.  235 people (73.9% of the population) lived in owner-occupied housing units and 83 people (26.1%) lived in rental housing units.

References

Census-designated places in Stanislaus County, California
Census-designated places in California